A number of ships of the French Navy have borne the name Méduse, after the Medusa. The best-known is arguable the 1810 frigate , of Théodore Géricault's Raft of the Medusa fame.

Ships 
 , a 30-gun 
  (1723), a 16-gun corvette
 , a 16-gun frigate
 , a 40-gun  launched in 1782 and burnt by accident in 1797. She was the lead ship of the Méduse sub-type.
 , a frigate.
 , a 40-gun  frigate launched in 1810 and wrecked in 1816. Her wreck inspired Théodore Géricault's Raft of the Medusa.
 , a 
  (1916), formerly the Spanish trawler Torremolinos, purchased by the Navy and used as an auxiliary patrol ship.
  (1930), a  launched in 1930 and wrecked in 1942.
  (1964), a support ship for minesweeping frogmen.

See also 
  (1797), a galley captured at Venice.
  (1939), a minesweeper.

Notes and references

Notes

References

Bibliography 
 
 

French Navy ship names